Çağlayan is a station on the Istanbul Metrobus Bus rapid transit line. It is located on the Istanbul Inner Beltway in Şişli, Istanbul, adjacent to the Istanbul Justice Palace. The station is serviced by five of the seven metrobus routes

The station was opened on 8 September 2008 as part of the ten station eastward expansion of the line.

References

External links
Çağlayan station
Çağlayan in Google Street View

Istanbul Metrobus stations
Şişli